The 1929 Thuringia state election was held on 8 December 1929 to elect the 53 members of the Landtag of Thuringia.

Results

References 

Thuringia
Elections in Thuringia
December 1929 events